The Suriname football champions are the winners of the highest league in Suriname football, which is currently the Hoofdklasse.

SV Robinhood has 23 league championships, which is the record for most titles won.

Hoofdklasse (1924present-)

Total titles won
Twenty-three clubs have been crowned champions in the highest division of Suriname football.

References

External links

champions
Suriname